Huallaga District is one of six districts of the province Bellavista in Peru.

References